Heungdeok-gu is a non-autonomous district in the City of Cheongju in North Chungcheong Province, South Korea. Heungdeok-gu was re-established from a part of Heungdeok-gu and a part of Cheongwon-gun in July 2014. The newly created Seowon-gu annexed the part of Heungdeok-gu.

Administrative divisions 
Heungdeok-gu is divided into one town (eup), 2 townships (myeon), and 8 neighbourhoods (dong).

References

External links 
  

Districts of Cheongju
1995 establishments in South Korea
States and territories established in 1995